Barbodes kuchingensis is a species of cyprinid fish native to Indonesia where it occurs in the Kapuas River basin and Malaysia where it is known from Sarawak.  It prefers sandy or rocky pools in clear foothill and forest streams.

References 

Barbodes
Freshwater fish of Indonesia
Fish described in 1940